Nico Buwalda ( – ) was a Dutch male footballer.

Club career
On club level he played for local side Rapiditas, Hercules and for Ajax, where he played alongside iconic defender Gé Fortgens.

International career
He was part of the Netherlands national football team, playing 2 matches against Germany and Belgium. He played his first match on 5 April 1914.

See also
 List of Dutch international footballers

References

External links
 

1890 births
1970 deaths
People from Weesp
Association football wingers
Dutch footballers
Netherlands international footballers
AFC Ajax players
Hercules players
Footballers from North Holland